The E2 European long distance path or E2 path is a 4850 km (3010-mile) series of long-distance footpaths that is intended to run from Galway in Ireland to France's Mediterranean coast and currently runs through Northern Ireland, Scotland, England, Belgium, Luxembourg and France, with an alternative midsection equally designated via the Netherlands and east coast of England. It is one of the network of European long-distance paths.

The paths are aimed at walkers; alternative routes exist in some parts for horse riders and cyclists.

Route 

The route has two alternative midsections, reuniting in north-east England and northern Belgium: the first devised route includes Oxford, Reading, Bruges and Antwerp and does not include the southern part of the Dutch coast.  The corollary midsection, listed as the alternative route, includes Hull, Lincoln, Cambridge and Bergen op Zoom.

In Belgium the route starts from Ostend on the GR5A (Grote Route 5A) via Bruges and Antwerp. After a few kilometres in the mid-northern municipality (district) of Zoersel in Belgium it joins the GR 5 (Grande Randonnée 5), which forms the remainder of the route, passing through Luxembourg, Eastern France, then Switzerland at Lake Geneva before returning to France to finish at Nice.

Ireland 

The Irish section of the route is not yet open.

Great Britain 

In Scotland the route starts from Stranraer and follows the Southern Upland Way, to Melrose, and St. Cuthbert's Way, from Melrose to Kirk Yetholm, and on to the Anglo-Scottish border via the Pennine Way.

In England the route continues on the Pennine Way from the border to Standedge, the Oldham Way from Standedge to Mossley, the Tameside Trail from Mossley to Broadbottom, the Etherow/Goyt Valley Way from Broadbottom to Compstall, the Goyt Way from Compstall to Disley, the Peak Forest Canal from Disley to Marple, the Gritstone Trail from Disley to Rushton Spencer, the Staffordshire Way from Rushton Spencer to Cannock Chase, the Heart of England Way from Cannock Chase to Bourton on the Water, the Oxfordshire Way from Bourton on the Water to Kirtlington, the Oxford Canal from Kirtlington to Oxford, the Thames Path from Oxford to Weybridge, the Wey Navigation Path from Weybridge to Guildford, and the North Downs Way from Guildford to Dover.

In England, the alternative midsection begins on the Pennine Way at Middleton-in-Teesdale. It then follows the Teesdale Way, the Cleveland Way, the Yorkshire Wolds Way, the Viking Way, the Hereward Way, the Fen Rivers Way, the Icknield Way Path, the Stour Valley Path and the Essex Way to Harwich International Port. Urban highlights are Lincoln and Cambridge.

Netherlands 

In the Netherlands the eastern route begins at the ferry port of Hook of Holland (where ferries from Harwich International Port arrive) and passes over islands and dams and through Bergen op Zoom. This corollary section picks up the main route at Sint Antonius, Zoersel in northern Belgium.

References

External links
 Waymarked Trails
 E2 - map and information by traildino
 European Ramblers Association

European long-distance paths
Long-distance footpaths in the United Kingdom
Hiking trails in France
Hiking trails in Switzerland